East Sumba Regency is geographically the largest of the four regencies which divide the island of Sumba, within East Nusa Tenggara Province of Indonesia. It occupies 64% (nearly two-thirds) of the entire island, being much less densely populated than the western third. The town of Waingapu is the capital of East Sumba Regency. The population of East Sumba Regency was 227,732 at the 2010 Census and 244,820 at the 2020 Census, comprising 125,967 male and 118,853 female; the official estimate as at mid 2021 was 246,618.

Administrative Districts 

The East Sumba Regency is composed of twenty-two districts (kecamatan), whose areas (in km2) and populations at the 2010 Census and 2020 Census are listed below, together with the official estimates as at mid 2021. The table also includes the locations of the district headquarters, the number of administrative villages (rural desa and urban kelurahan) in each district, and its postal code.

Note: (a) except village of Lukuwingir (which has a postcode of 87116).

Airport
Umbu Mehang Kunda Airport, also formerly known as Mau Hau Airport, has a 6,070-ft (1.850 metres) long runway with 98-ft (30 metres) width and can accommodate Boeing 737-300 aircraft.  The Airport inaugurated a new terminal in 2016 which has been able to improve the passenger services from the previous old terminal.

References

Regencies of East Nusa Tenggara
Sumba